Travian Anthony Sousa (born September 19, 2001) is an American professional soccer player who plays as a left-back for MLS Next Pro club Tacoma Defiance.

Club career

Youth
Sousa played in the US Soccer Development Academy for Sacramento Republic after joining them from Ballistic United SC in 2016. In total, Sousa made 82 appearances in the USSDA, scoring a total of 24 goals.

Hamburger SV
In July 2019, Sousa moved to Germany, joining the Hamburger SV acacdemy. Sousa went on to make 14 appearances with the team's U-19s in the A-Junioren Bundesliga, tallying four assists. Sousa also made two appearances for Hamburger SV II in the Regionalliga Nord. He left Hamburg in October 2020, reportedly having his contract terminated for "disciplinary reasons", but the player saying the decision was "mutual" between both player and club.

Sporting Kansas City II
On January 29, 2021, Sousa returned to the United States, joining USL Championship club Sporting Kansas City II. Sousa and Kansas City mutually agreed to terminate his contract with the club on September 23, 2021, without him making an appearance for the club.

Oakland Roots
On September 28, 2021, Sousa returned to California, signing with USL Championship side Oakland Roots. He made his debut for Oakland on October 6, 2021, appearing as a 90th-minute substitute in a 2–1 win over Sacramento Republic. Sousa's contract option wasn't picked up by Oakland following their 2021 season.

Tacoma Defiance
On March 18, 2022, it was announced that Sousa had signed with MLS Next Pro club Tacoma Defiance.

International career
Sousa has been a regular member of the United States at various youth levels.

Personal
Sousa is of Portuguese descent and holds dual American and Portuguese citizenship.

Career statistics

References

External links
Sporting KC profile

Living people
1999 births
American expatriate soccer players
American expatriate soccer players in Germany
American people of Portuguese descent
American soccer players
Association football defenders
Hamburger SV players
MLS Next Pro players
Oakland Roots SC players
People from Modesto, California
Soccer players from California
Sporting Kansas City II players
Tacoma Defiance players
United States men's youth international soccer players
USL Championship players